Pinakini Express (Train No: 12711/12712) is a daily Superfast Intercity Express train that runs between Vijayawada Junction in Andhra Pradesh and Chennai Central in Tamil Nadu. This train belongs to Vijayawada Division of South Central Railway Zone.

History 
The train, which began its services in 1991, between Vijayawada and Chennai developed a unique bond between the people of Andhra Pradesh and Tamilnadu.

Pinakini Intercity Express, which derived its name from Penna or Pinakini River passing through Nellore City which lies between Chennai and Vijayawada.

This is the best train to reach Chennai in a short duration of time comfortably. Thousands of passengers prefer this train due to its convenient timings and its connectivity towards down South.

This train travels 430 kms on each side and consists of 12 halts in between. Pinakini Express enjoys amazing patronage and its occupancy rate is more than 100 per cent throughout the year. Many employees, students, season ticket holders of Krishna, Guntur, Prakasam and Nellore districts daily choose this train as the safest means to travel to their workplaces and destinations due to its convenient timings and best punctuality performance.

Initially the train consisted of 18 coaches, later coaches were increased to 24 due to heavy demand. Pinakini Express has single standard ICF rake and is being primarily maintained at Vijayawada since its inception. It has three AC Chair Car coaches, nine reserved and nine unreserved non-AC coaches, pantry car and two SLR (Seating-cum-Luggage Rake) coaches. The rake was upgraded with safer CBC (Central Buffer Coupler) coupling by replacing old screw coupling as a measure of enhanced safety. It also equipped with bio toilets and OBHS staff for on board cleaning during the journey.

Gallery

Route and Halts

Traction and Coach Composition 
It is hauled by a Lallaguda-based WAP-7 and Vijayawada-based WAP-7 locomotive.
Coach composition of Pinakini Express 
From Vijayawada to Chennai (12711)
It runs with ICF-CBC coaches (Green indicating Electric locomotive, Yellow indicating colour of the general coaches, pink indicating reserved coaches and blue indicating AC coaches)

From Chennai to Vijayawada(12712)
It runs with ICF-CBC coaches (Green indicating Electric locomotive, Yellow indicating colour of the general coaches, pink indicating reserved coaches and blue indicating AC coaches)

Achievements 
Pinakini Express is the first train in the south India to get a green toilet.

See also 
Krishna Express
Express trains in India
Jan Shatabdi Express

References 

Transport in Vijayawada
Transport in Chennai
Superfast Express Trains
Named passenger trains of India
Rail transport in Andhra Pradesh
Express trains in India
Rail transport in Tamil Nadu
Railway services introduced in 1992